Gongneung-dong is a dong, neighbourhood of Nowon-gu in Seoul, South Korea.

Notable places
Seoul Women's University
Sahmyook University
Seoul National University of Technology
Korea Military Academy (육군사관학교)
Taereung National Village (태릉선수촌 泰陵選手村)
Taerueng (태릉 泰陵)
Gangneung (강릉 康陵)
Samgunbu Cheongheondang (삼군부청헌당 三軍府淸憲堂)

See also 
Administrative divisions of South Korea

References

External links
 Nowon-gu Official site in English
 Map of Nowon-gu
 Nowon-gu Official site
 Gongneung 1, 3-dong Resident office  

Neighbourhoods of Nowon District